Liana Tsotadze (born 7 June 1961) is a Georgian former diver who competed in the 1980 Summer Olympics.

References

1961 births
Living people
Female divers from Georgia (country)
Olympic divers of the Soviet Union
Divers at the 1980 Summer Olympics
Olympic bronze medalists for the Soviet Union
Olympic medalists in diving
Medalists at the 1980 Summer Olympics